Leptospermum luehmannii is a species of shrub or small tree that is endemic to Queensland. It has glossy green elliptic leaves, white flowers and fruit that falls from the plant shortly after the seeds are released.

Description
It has smooth, reddish brown bark that peels in long strips.

Taxonomy and naming
Leptospermum luehmannii was first formally described in 1900 by Frederick Manson Bailey in his book The Queensland Flora. The specific epithet honours J.G.Luehmann.

Distribution and habitat
This tea-tree grows on the summit and slopes of the Glass House Mountains and in the Numinbah Valley. 

The National Herbarium of New South Wales lists this species as having the common names "ngun ngun may bush", or "hillside wild may bush" and as occurring in New South Wales between Grafton and Glen Innes, although with a note that the "NSW population [is] likely to be taxonomically distinct."

References

luehmannii
Flora of Queensland
Myrtales of Australia
Plants described in 1900
Taxa named by Frederick Manson Bailey